John Day Highway No. 5 is a highway in eastern Oregon.  It comprises Oregon Route 19 (OR 19) and U.S. Route 26 (US 26), as well as short segments of OR 206, OR 207, and US 395.

Route description
At Spray, it splits from OR 207 and goes southward. The highway passes the community of Kimberly, through the John Day Fossil Beds National Monument, and meets up with U.S. 26. The highway then follows US 26 eastward, through the communities of Dayville, Mount Vernon, Prairie City, Unity, Ironside, and Jamieson. The John Day Highway ends at Vale.

The John Day Highway from Fossil to Austin Junction is also a part of the Journey Through Time Scenic Byway, an Oregon state byway.

Major intersections

See also
John Day, Oregon
John Day River

References

External links

Transportation in Gilliam County, Oregon
Transportation in Wheeler County, Oregon
Transportation in Grant County, Oregon
Transportation in Baker County, Oregon
Transportation in Malheur County, Oregon
U.S. Route 26
Named state highways in Oregon